The 2014 Colonial Athletic Association men's basketball tournament was held March 7–10 at the Baltimore Arena in Baltimore, Maryland. The champion received an automatic bid to the 2014 NCAA tournament.

The 2014 tournament featured nine teams due to the departure of George Mason from the conference to join the Atlantic 10, and the addition of the College of Charleston.

Seeds

Schedule

Bracket

Awards and honors
Tournament MVP
 Jarvis Threatt, Delaware

All-Tournament Team
 Jarvis Threatt, Delaware
 Carl Baptiste, Delaware
 Devon Sadler, Delaware
 Marcus Thornton, William & Mary
 Brandon Britt, William & Mary
 Scott Eatherton, Northeastern

Game summaries

First round

Quarterfinals

Semifinals

Championship

References

Colonial Athletic Association men's basketball tournament
2013–14 Colonial Athletic Association men's basketball season
CAA men's basketball tournament
CAA men's basketball tournament
Basketball competitions in Baltimore